Caliapora is an extinct genus of corals from the Devonian.

See also 
 List of prehistoric hexacoral genera

References 

 Early Devonian Brachiopods from the Lesser Khingan District of NorthEast China. Takashi Hamada
 

Prehistoric Anthozoa genera
Hexacorallia genera
Fossil taxa described in 1889
Paleozoic life of the Northwest Territories